Two Came Back is a 1997 television film based on the true story of Deborah Scaling Kiley as told in her book Albatross (1994). Melissa Joan Hart stars alongside Jonathan Brandis.

Plot
Susan Clarkson (Melissa Joan Hart) agrees to go with Jason (Jonathan Brandis) and three other young crew members and deliver a 60-foot sailing yacht from San Diego to Vancouver to a potential buyer. However the over-anxious captain sails off course and the crew runs into some bad weather. While out at sea, the yacht sinks, leaving the crew to fend for themselves against the merciless elements. All trapped on the yacht's dinghy, they find themselves without food, water or supplies and with sharks posing a constant threat to their survival.

Cast
Melissa Joan Hart as Susan Clarkson
Jonathan Brandis as Jason
David Gail as Matt
Susan Sullivan as Patricia Clarkson
Jon Pennell as Rick
Susan Walters as Allie
Steven Ford as Lieutenant Belwick
James D. Fields as Susan's teammate
Elliot Woods as Coast Guardsman
Tracy Villar as Coast Guardswoman

See also
Capsized: Blood in the Water, film based on same events

External links

American television films
1997 television films
1997 films
Films based on non-fiction books
Seafaring films based on actual events
Films about survivors of seafaring accidents or incidents
Films directed by Dick Lowry
Films scored by Michael Tavera